Sermen Saponenko is a Belarusian sprint canoer who competed in the early to mid-2000s. He won two bronze medals at the ICF Canoe Sprint World Championships (C-4 200 m: 2005, C-4 1000 m: 2002).

References

Belarusian male canoeists
Living people
Year of birth missing (living people)
ICF Canoe Sprint World Championships medalists in Canadian